Assaf Schuster is an Israeli entrepreneur and professor of computer science whose works have been published in such journals as Computer Aided Verification and Journal of Systems and Software.

Biography
Schuster was born in 1958 in the Israeli kibbutz Givat Brenner to Tzipora and Yochanan Schuster. His family is of Ashkenazi-Jewish origin.

Schuster began his academic studies at the Hebrew University in 1981, and graduated in 1984, with a bachelor's degree in mathematics and computer science. In 1986, he graduated with a master's degree in computer science. After receiving his degree, Schuster worked as a teacher at Ort College in Givat Ram, Jerusalem. In 1991 Schuster received a doctorate at the Hebrew University of Jerusalem in computer science. His PhD topic dealt with the dynamic configuration of communication networks for parallel computation, under the guidance of Eli Shamir. He then started working at Technion - Israel Institute of Technology. In 2000, he became an associate professor and in 2007, he became a professor.

In 2015 he was named a Fellow of the Association for Computing Machinery for his contributions to cloud computing.

In 2016, Schuster co-founded a startup called Cy-oT (Cyber of Things), along with Natan Bandler and Daniel Moscovici. Schuster served as the CTO until the company was sold to Verint in 2019.

References

Hebrew University of Jerusalem School of Computer Science & Engineering alumni
Academic staff of Technion – Israel Institute of Technology
Living people
20th-century births
Israeli computer scientists
Fellows of the Association for Computing Machinery
Year of birth missing (living people)
Place of birth missing (living people)